{{DISPLAYTITLE:Pi2 Ursae Minoris}}

Pi2 Ursae Minoris, which is Latinized from π2 UMi Ursae Minoris, is a binary star system in the northern circumpolar constellation of Ursa Minor. The pair have a combined apparent visual magnitude of 6.89, which can be viewed with a pair of binoculars. They are located at a distance of approximately 400 light years from the Sun based on parallax, but are drifting closer with a radial velocity of −32 km/s.

This star was found to be a double system by  O. Struve in 1832, and the pair have now completed a full orbit. There is a lot of scatter in the data though, so the grade of the orbital elements is rated as poor. The system has a high eccentricity of 0.96 and they orbit each other with a period of roughly 172 years. The magnitude 7.32 primary is an F-type main-sequence star with a stellar classification of F1V. The fainter secondary has a magnitude of 8.15 and is G-type star.
At present the angular separation between both stars is 0.67 arcseconds .

References

F-type main-sequence stars
G-type main-sequence stars
Binary stars
Ursa Minor (constellation)
Ursae Minoris, Pi2
Durchmusterung objects
Ursae Minoris, 18
141652
076695